Arbor Lodge State Historical Park and Arboretum is a mansion and arboretum located at 2600 Arbor Avenue, Nebraska City, Nebraska, United States. The park is a National Historic Landmark listed on the National Register of Historic Places since 1969.

The 52-room neo-colonial house began in 1855 for J. Sterling Morton, originator of Arbor Day and Secretary of Agriculture in the 1890s under President Grover Cleveland. It was extended several times, most recently in 1903, and in later years served as the summer home for his son Joy Morton, founder of Morton Salt Company. The mansion features Victorian and Empire furnishings, many of which were owned by the Mortons. Its sun parlor contains a fine Tiffany skylight with grape trellis design.

Trees were a central interest of J. Sterling Morton. He imported trees from all over the country in order to test their suitability to create windbreaks and otherwise break up the monotony of the great plains. The house is surrounded by 270 varieties of trees and shrubs, including gardens, apple orchards, and acres of oaks, maples, chestnuts, and pines, including at least 10 state-champion trees. Specimen trees are typically labeled with engraved bronze plates. Over the years, many of Arbor Lodge's apple orchards were demolished, but in the 1990s their restoration began with plantings of winesaps, golden delicious, red delicious, jonathans, and jonadels.

Activities and amenities
The mansion functions as a museum and contains many items related to the early history of Nebraska, Otoe County, and Nebraska City. The park includes an arboretum, Italian terraced garden, log cabin, carriage house with early carriages, walking trails, and 200 varieties of lilacs. Since 2014, the state park has been managed by the Arbor Day Foundation.

See also
List of botanical gardens in the United States
National Register of Historic Places listings in Otoe County, Nebraska
List of National Historic Landmarks in Nebraska

References

External links

Arbor Lodge State Historical Park Nebraska Game and Parks Commission
Arbor Day Farm Arbor Day Foundation

Arboreta in Nebraska
Botanical gardens in Nebraska
State parks of Nebraska
National Historic Landmarks in Nebraska
Houses completed in 1855
Historic house museums in Nebraska
Museums in Otoe County, Nebraska
Automobile museums in Nebraska
Protected areas of Otoe County, Nebraska
Protected areas established in 1923
Houses on the National Register of Historic Places in Nebraska
Buildings and structures in Nebraska City, Nebraska
Tourist attractions in Nebraska City, Nebraska
Houses in Otoe County, Nebraska
National Register of Historic Places in Otoe County, Nebraska